The national emblem of the Chuvash Autonomous Soviet Socialist Republic was adopted in 1937 by the government of the Chuvash Autonomous Soviet Socialist Republic. The emblem is identical to the emblem of the Russian Soviet Federative Socialist Republic.

History

First version 
The first emblem of the Chuvash ASSR was identical to the emblem of the Russian SFSR. The differences were only in the inscription.

Second version 
In the Constitution of the Chuvash Empire, adopted on January 31, 1926, stipulated that the republic may have a coat of arms and a flag. On February 25, 1926, at a meeting of the Presidium of the Central Executive Committee of the Chuvash ASSR, a commission was formed to develop the emblem and the flag of the republic. A contest for the best design of the coat of arms was organized. After finalizing the drafts at a meeting on December 10, 1926, the commission decided to adopt the coat of arms of Chuvashia with the following description:

The emblem was designed by the artist and photographer P.E. Martens, a graduate of the Baron Stieglitz Institute (now Academy of Applied Arts).

First revision 
By decree of the Presidium of the CEC of the Chuvash ASSR on January 3, 1927, the state coat of arms of the Chuvash ASSR was adopted with some changes: the background of the emblem became red, the sickle, the hammer, the stars and the rays - golden. The inscription "ЧССР" was represented in two languages: on the left - "Тавашсен Автономла Сотсиалисампа Council Респуплеке", and on the right - "Чувашская Автономная Социалистическая Советская Республика". The initials "Р.С.Ф.С.Р." were placed below.

The 2nd (7th) Congress of Soviets of the Chuvash Autonomous Socialist Soviet Republic finally approved the coat of arms which was created in 1927, adopting the Resolution "On the State Coat of Arms of the Chuvash ASSR" on March 30, 1927. This decree established the following description of the emblem:

Second revision 
On February 12, 1931, the IV (IX) Congress of Soviets of the Chuvash Autonomous Soviet Socialist Republic corrected the images of the coat of arms and the flag, adopting the decree "On the State Emblem and the Flag of the Chuvash Autonomous Soviet Socialist Republic". Decorative elements in the form of the Chuvash national ornament  were removed from the official symbols of the state due to "not reflecting the correct national policy of the proletarian state". A new description of the emblem was as:

Third version 
July 18, 1938, the Chuvash ASSR adopted a new "Stalinist" Constitution of the Chuvash Autonomous Soviet Socialist Republic. According to the text of the Constitution, the coat of arms of the Chuvash ASSR was the emblem of the RSFSR with some inscriptions in Chuvash style. The official blazon for the emblem from the Constitution of 1938:

First revision 
The extraordinary VIII session of the 9th Supreme Soviet of the Chuvash ASSR on May 31, 1978 approved a new Constitution of the Chuvash Autonomous Soviet Socialist Republic. The symbols of the republic, the coat of arms and the flag, were described in the Article 157 and 158. In general, the coat of arms and the flag remained the same, but with some minor changes.

Gallery

References 

Chuvash ASSR
Chuvash Autonomous Soviet Socialist Republic
Chuvash ASSR
Chuvash ASSR
Chuvash ASSR
Chuvash ASSR
Chuvash ASSR
Chuvash ASSR
Chuvash ASSR